Bryan Cohen (born May 10, 1989) is an American-Israeli former basketball player. He played the shooting guard position. He won a gold medal with Team USA in the 2009 Maccabiah Games. He played college basketball for the Bucknell Bison, and was the Patriot League Defensive Player of Year in 2010, 2011, and 2012—the only player in league history to win the award three times. He played from 2012–14 for Maccabi Haifa in the Israeli Basketball Premier League.

Early life
Bryan Cohen was born on May 10, 1989, in Huntingdon Valley, Pennsylvania. He is Jewish, and has dual U.S.–Israeli citizenship. His older brother Aron Cohen played basketball for the University of Pennsylvania.

Athletic career
Cohen attended Abington Friends School, graduating in 2008. He played basketball for the Kangaroos.

Cohen played basketball for Team USA in the 2009 Maccabiah Games, winning a gold medal.

He next attended Bucknell University, graduating with a degree in economics in 2012. Cohen played basketball for the Bucknell Bison as a starting guard from 2008–12. His 353 points as a freshman in 2008–09 were the fourth-most by a freshman in Bucknell history, and he was named All-Rookie Patriot League. In 2009–10 he ranked ninth in the Patriot League in assists (84) and assists per game (2.7). In 2011–12 he was seventh in the Patriot League in assists (87), and eighth in assists per game (2.5).

He was named Patriot League Defensive Player of Year in 2010, 2011, and 2012; he was the only player in league history to win the award three times, and the seventh in any NCAA Division I conference to win a defensive MVP award three times. He was named second-team All-Patriot League as a senior. His 313 career assists ranked eighth in school history. He was awarded the Bradley N. Tufts Award, presented to a Bucknell senior student-athlete in recognition of exceptional athletic achievements.

Cohen played from 2012–14 for Maccabi Haifa in the Israeli Basketball Premier League.

Business career
Cohen became a licensed insurance agent and worked for Liberty Mutual from 2014 to 2017. From 2015 to 2019 he worked as an Acquisition Analyst & Property Manager for CB Property Management LLC in Philadelphia. He joined Full Court Development of Philadelphia in 2019 as a leasing agent.

Awards and honors
Cohen is scheduled to be inducted into the Philadelphia Jewish Sports Hall of Fame in 2021.

References

External links
Jen Mok (March 8, 2012). "Meet the Bucknell Basketball Team-Bryan Cohen," Her Campus.

1989 births
Living people
American men's basketball players
Basketball players from Philadelphia
Bucknell Bison men's basketball players
Businesspeople from Philadelphia
Competitors at the 2009 Maccabiah Games
Israeli American
Israeli Basketball Premier League players
Israeli men's basketball players
Jewish American sportspeople
Jewish Israeli sportspeople
Jewish men's basketball players
Maccabiah Games gold medalists for the United States
Maccabiah Games medalists in basketball
Maccabi Haifa B.C. players
People from Montgomery County, Pennsylvania
Shooting guards
21st-century American Jews